{{Taxobox
| image = Catatinagma trivittellum.jpg
| image_caption =  Catatinagma trivittellum 
| regnum = Animalia
| phylum = Arthropoda
| classis = Insecta
| ordo = Lepidoptera
| familia = Gelechiidae
| genus = Catatinagma| genus_authority = Rebel 1903
| synonyms =
}}Catatinagma is a genus of moth in the family Gelechiidae.

Species
Catatinagma kraterella Junnilainen & Nuppoen, 2010
Catatinagma stenoptera Bidzilya, 2014
Catatinagma trivittellum Rebel, 1903

References

 ;  2010: The gelechiid fauna of the southern Ural Mountains, part I: descriptions of seventeen new species (Lepidoptera: Gelechiidae). Zootaxa, 2366: 1–34. Preview
  2014: A remarkable new species of the genus Catatinagma Rebel, 1903 (Lepidoptera, Gelechiidae) from Turkmenistan. Nota lepidopterologica, 37'''(1): 67-74. 

Apatetrini
Moth genera